The Morobe – Eastern Highlands languages form a branch of the Trans–New Guinea language family of New Guinea in the classification of Timothy Usher. It unites the Kainantu–Goroka (Eastern Highlands), Finisterre–Huon and Angan (Kratke Range) languages:

Eastern Highlands (Kainantu–Goroka, Eastern Highlands Province)
Finisterre–Huon (northeastern Morobe Province)
Kratke Range (Angan, southeastern Morobe Province)

References